The Conservative Congregational Christian Conference (CCCC or 4Cs) is a Congregationalist denomination of Protestant Christianity. It is based in the United States.

The denomination maintains headquarters in Lake Elmo, Minnesota, a suburb of St. Paul. It is a member of the World Evangelical Congregational Fellowship and the National Association of Evangelicals.

History
The CCCC has its roots in the Conservative Congregational Christian Fellowship, which was formed in 1945 within the Congregational Christian Churches by churches and ministers who disagreed with what they perceived as an unacceptable liberal direction being taken by the majority of the denomination's members and leadership. In 1948, this group established itself as the CCCC.

The CCCC was one of two U.S. Congregational Christian bodies to split from the main denomination in the decade leading up to the 1957 merger of the Congregational Christian Church with the Evangelical and Reformed Church, forming the United Church of Christ (UCC). The other dissenting Congregational Christian group was the National Association of Congregational Christian Churches (NACCC), which split from the main group in 1955 over concerns about maintaining congregational polity and opposition to some national CC ethical and political stances, not over theology per se.

Theology/doctrine
The CCCC espouses theologically conservative views. It opposes homosexuality, abortion, and non-marital sexual activity. The CCCC holds fast to orthodox Protestant Christian faith and inerrancy is a guiding principle in Biblical interpretation carried out by ministers and teachers. Some ministers have sought to revive an interest in the study and teachings of Puritanism; however, both Reformed and Arminian emphases may be found in the CCCC, as is usually the case with larger, more broadly-based evangelical groups.

Practices
The CCCC admits churches of any origin that operate according to congregational polity and that subscribe to the denomination's Statement of Faith, which contains most of the tenets of conservative evangelicalism as developed throughout the 20th century. Although refusing to permit critiques concerning the main points of doctrine, the CCCC does allow for local opinion and practices in matters not pertaining to those subjects addressed in the Statement. The motto “In essentials, unity. In non-essentials, liberty, and in all things, love” is repeated freely in CCCC circles. Member churches derive not only from the founding Congregational and Christian traditions, but also Evangelical and Reformed (former UCC member congregations), Baptist, and non-denominational heritages; most churches joining the CCCC subsequent to the denomination's founding have been acquisitions, rather than new starts.

Structure
The local church is the basic unit of the CCCC, but churches and pastors nevertheless agree to voluntarily associate with other churches of like mind.  To that end, regional fellowships are established across the United States, much in the same manner as the UCC and NACCC; the role of the regional body is more similar to the NACCC than the UCC, in order to restrain the tendency toward inter-congregational authority.  Moderators of each area fellowship are chosen by the local fellowship (composed of representatives from area CCCC churches and nearby CCCC member ministers).  Area Representatives are appointed by the Conference Minister (who functions as the Executive Director or National Pastor for the CCCC).  Area Representatives serve as local CCCC contacts, to represent the Conference Minister, and to serve as a liaison between the national organization and the area fellowships.

Statistics
As of 2005, the CCCC had 42,838 members in 275 churches. It has experienced steady growth since its founding. As of 2000, there were congregations in 30 states. Membership is concentrated primarily in Massachusetts, New York, Pennsylvania, and the Midwest. As of 2010, the CCCC had 42,296 members in 298 member churches.

See also
Congregational Library

References

Sources
Yearbook, Conservative Congregational Christian Conference
Handbook of Denominations, 12th edition (Abingdon Press)
Modern Day Pilgrims (2000: Foresee Publications, St. Paul, Minn.)
Foresee (official newsletter of the Conference)

External links
CCCC Website
Some Statistics on the CCCC
Article about UCC Churches joining the CCCC
Profile of the CCCC on the Association of Religion Data Archives website

 
Christian organizations established in 1948
Reformed denominations in the United States
Congregational denominations established in the 20th century
1948 establishments in the United States
Members of the National Association of Evangelicals